Nirdoshi may refer to:
 Nirdoshi (1951 film), a Telugu/Tamil film
 Nirdoshi (1967 film), an Indian Telugu-language crime drama film